McCook is an unincorporated community in Hidalgo County, Texas, United States.

History
McCook was founded circa 1925. By 1936, the community had its own school district, post office, and church; for the next few decades, its population hovered near 40 residents. By 1964, the population had risen to 100. As of 2000, the population was 91; the residents were spread out over a rural area.

References

Unincorporated communities in Hidalgo County, Texas
Unincorporated communities in Texas